Gonzalo Pineda Reyes (born October 19, 1982) is a Mexican professional football manager and former player, who is the current head coach of Major League Soccer club Atlanta United. Pineda played as a defensive midfielder for several clubs in Mexico, and also represented Mexico internationally. He last played in 2015 for the Seattle Sounders FC. He became assistant coach of the Sounders beginning with the 2017 season.

Club playing career
Pineda made his professional debut in the Mexican Division in 2002–2003 season playing for UNAM Pumas in a 0–1 defeat against Morelia. Gonzalo is known as an excellent marker and for his powerful left foot. He helped UNAM to the Clausura and Apertura titles in 2004.

In the 2005–2006 Season, Pineda was transferred to Chivas de Guadalajara. Pineda was a notable starter in his first season with Chivas. However, in Apertura 2006 he had a difficult season, starting as a substitute for Juan Pablo Rodriguez and rumors rose that he might walk out of Chivas after the season since he wasn't playing. He was quoted by the press saying that he had not enough level to be playing for Chivas. Eventually, after bad performances by Rodriguez, Pineda made it to the starting lineup again and proved that he was worthy of the starting team. He played well the remainder of the games and eventually became champion for the third time in his career. Gonzalo's solid skills in the midfield and his consistent performances had earned him an indisputable spot with Chivas.

After the Clausura 2008, Chivas put Pineda in their summer transfer list. As of June 17, 2008 Pineda was due to play the Apertura 2008 with Atlante F.C.; however, he made it clear that he would not leave Chivas and remained with the team. Gonzalo was sent on a 6-month loan with San Luis for the Torneo Bicentenario in 2010. In his debut for San Luis he got a red card in the 39th minute and was suspended for three games.

On May 24, 2010, the press revealed that Pineda would play for Cruz Azul in The Centenario 2010 Tournament, which was confirmed by Sport Director Alberto Quintano. In one season at the club, Pineda made 35 appearances and scored one goal. Pineda played two seasons with Puebla F.C. on loan in 2011 and in 2012, then went on loan to Queretaro F.C. In 2013, after his loan deal expired, he went into free agency after not finding a new club.

Following his release, Pineda joined Seattle Sounders FC of Major League Soccer on a preseason trial. He signed with the club on March 5, 2014.

On January 7, 2016, Pineda announced his retirement from playing football.

International playing career

Gonzalo Pineda was part of Mexico's Olympic football team, which exited in the first round, having finished third in group A, below group winners Mali and South Korea.

Pineda made his international debut for the senior Mexico national team against Trinidad & Tobago on September 8, 2004, in Mexico's qualification matches for the 2006 FIFA World Cup.

He played mainly as a substitute in ten of Mexico's qualification matches for the 2006 World Cup and played five games in the 2005 FIFA Confederations Cup in Germany, where he converted a Panenka-style penalty kick against Argentina. In June 2006, he was selected by coach Ricardo Lavolpe, to be part of the 23 man Mexican squad to play in the 2006 FIFA World Cup Tournament in Germany. He started in Mexico's first three World Cup games.

Pineda was once again called to the Mexico national team during Hugo Sánchez's tenure as coach. He played for Mexico in Copa América 2007.

International goals

Media and coaching career
After announcing his retirement from football and his intention of becoming a coach, Pineda joined Univision, working as a soccer analyst for the American Spanish-language national broadcast network.

On January 20, 2017, Pineda rejoined Seattle Sounders FC as an assistant coach on Brian Schmetzer's staff. He signed a contract extension with the club in March 2021, following an off-season interview with D.C. United for their head coach vacancy.

Atlanta United
On August 12, 2021, Pineda was appointed head coach at Major League Soccer club Atlanta United.

Personal life
Pineda earned his U.S. green card in June 2015. This status also qualified him as a domestic player for MLS roster purposes. Since his family had achieved US citizenship, Pineda felt it was in their best interest to stay in this country and not return to Mexico after retirement. Pineda lives in Seattle with his wife, Reyna, and their two children.

Managerial statistics

Honours
UNAM
Primera División de México: Clausura 2004, Apertura 2004
Campeón de Campeones: 2004

Guadalajara
Primera División de México: Apertura 2006
InterLiga: 2009

Seattle Sounders FC
Lamar Hunt U.S. Open Cup: 2014
MLS Supporters' Shield: 2014

Mexico U23
CONCACAF Olympic Qualifying Championship: 2004

References

External links

1982 births
Living people
Mexican expatriate footballers
Mexican footballers
Mexico international footballers
Footballers from Mexico City
C.D. Guadalajara footballers
Club Universidad Nacional footballers
San Luis F.C. players
Cruz Azul footballers
Club Puebla players
Querétaro F.C. footballers
Seattle Sounders FC players
Liga MX players
Major League Soccer players
Olympic footballers of Mexico
Footballers at the 2004 Summer Olympics
2005 CONCACAF Gold Cup players
2005 FIFA Confederations Cup players
2006 FIFA World Cup players
2007 Copa América players
Expatriate soccer players in the United States
Association football midfielders
Seattle Sounders FC non-playing staff
Atlanta United FC coaches